Pyrus ussuriensis, also known as the Ussurian pear, Harbin pear, and Manchurian  pear, is a species of flowering plant in the family Rosaceae.

It is native to Korea, Japan, and the Ussuri River area of far eastern Russia. It has flowers in spring that are slightly pink when budding and then turn white. Buds are dark brown and have an alternating arrangement. It is considered the hardiest of all pears. When planted in milder climates, the trees have been known to be killed by freezes after they begin budding. Many species of birds and mammals feed upon the fruit of this species. Deer, mice, and rabbits are known to damage the trees. Leaves are dark green in spring and summer and turn dark red and gold in autumn. Products made from the fruits may prove more effective than commercial insecticides in killing ticks and mites. The fruits are not the tastiest of pears to humans, but the taste is better after a freeze and the juice tastes better. Crosses of this species with other pears produces tasty pears that grow in climates too cold for most pears.

Cultivars include the 'Reli', 'Jinxiang', 'Hongbalixiang', 'Baibalixiang', 'Fuwuxiang', 'Qiuxiang', 'Fuanjianba', 'Longxiang', 'Guanhongxiao', 'Shanli24', 'Wuxiangli', 'Shatangli', 'Manyuanxiang', 'McDermand' , and the Prairie Gem® Flowering Pear (cultivar ‘MorDak’). There are at least 108 compounds in the fruits that affect plant breeding and these show that P. ussuriensis cultivars fall into 4 groups.

References

External links 

ussuriensis